Eru may refer to:

People
Eru (singer) (born 1983), Korean singer
Eru Potaka-Dewes (1939–2009), New Zealand actor
Syd Eru (born 1971), New Zealand rugby player

Other uses
 Eru (soup), a Cameroonian soup
 Eru (vegetable), a tropical African vine and vegetable 
 Eru, Estonia
 Egyptian Russian University, in Badr, Egypt
 Emergency Response Unit
 Emission Reduction Unit, under the Joint Implementation of the Kyoto Protocol
 Equilibrium rate of unemployment in macroeconomic theory
 Equine recurrent uveitis, a horse disease
 Eru Ilúvatar, a fictional deity in J. R. R. Tolkien's Middle-earth legendarium
 Yery, a letter of the Cyrillic alphabet
 Eru, a character in the manga series Shugo Chara!